Ivan Tišov (8 February 1870 – 20 September 1928) was a Croatian painter. He studied art at the Academy of Fine Arts, Munich, bringing back ideas from the Munich Secession movement to Zagreb. He is best known for his work in public and government buildings in Zagreb, and paintings in churches in his native Slavonia in north-east Croatia.

Biography 
Ivan Tišov was born 
in the village of Viškovci near Đakovo.

He attended elementary school in the village, and continued his education at the School of Crafts in Zagreb. He attended the School of Applied Arts in Vienna, and received a scholarship to the Academy of Fine Arts, Munich. From 1895, he was a vocational teacher, and professor of painting and drawing at the Academy of Fine Arts, Zagreb where he worked for the rest of his life.

While he was still studying in Vienna, Tišov received a commission to paint four allegorical works on the ceiling of the Golden Hall in Zagreb, under the titles of worship, theology, art and science. With his picture of Art, also known as Music, Tišov won a bronze medal at the Millennium Exhibition in Budapest in 1896.

Tišov painted many portraits, working directly with brush, without sketches and drawings achieving an amazing likeness. He painted his wife Ana Neuhäuser, Vladimir Vidrić, Grga Martić and many others.

By the end of the century, Tišov's painting showed the influence of Vlaho Bukovac. His pictures became darker with contrasting yellow, blue and green. Themes were taken from his native Slavonia, such as the painting "Under the Maple" (Pod javorom) which is one of his most beautiful works. In later years, folklore would replace mythology. In addition, Tišov worked on wall paintings in Križevci and Bjelovar, in St. Catherine and other churches.

He spent a year (1913–1914), training in Paris at the Académie Julian, to prepare for making decorations in the University Library in Zagreb.

He died in Zagreb on 20 September 1928.

Legacy 
Ivan Tišov's paintings of worship, theology, art and science decorate the ceilings in the Croatian Institute of History in Zagreb.

Although largely in the shadow of the other greats of Croatian art at the time (primarily Vlaho Bukovac, his work has an essentially timeless quality. He was a skilled colourist, and his work contains originality of composition, yet lacks the freedom of expression that marks other contemporary painters. However, as much of his painting was large government orders, and for the church - altar paintings in the Roman Catholic Church, the Orthodox Iconostasis of the Church of Saint Nicholas in Pačetin, the foyer ceiling of the Croatian National Theatre, and the "Golden Hall" building of the Department of Religion and Education of the Government of Zagreb - that should not be too surprising. His paintings mark the late classical period and its transition towards secession style in painting.

Works
Tišov's works include:
 Worship (Bogoštovlje)
 Theology (Nastava)
 Art (Umjetnost), also sometimes known as Music
 Science (Znanost)
 Kiss (Poljubac), 1902
 Paris Court (Parisov sud), 1902
 Salome Dances (Ples Salome), 1902
 Piper from Posavina (Gajdaša iz Posavine), 1902
 Under the Maple (Pod javorom), 1906
 Portrait of Ana Neuhäuser
 Portrait of Vladimir Vidrić
 Portrait of Grga Martić
 Foyer ceiling of the National Theatre in Zagreb, 1905
 Kraljevac Stream (Potok Kraljevac), 1912
 Self-portrait (Autoportret), 1914
 Decorations for the University Library (now National Archives) in Zagreb, 1914
 Wealth of the World (Bogatstvo svijeta), 1916
 Stream in Winter (Potok zimi), 1922
 Creation, Last Judgement in the Greek Catholic Cathedral in Križevci
 Oil paintings and frescoes in a number of churches in Zagreb, Križevci Korenica, Bjelovar, Plaško, Stražeman

Exhibitions
During his lifetime, Tišov exhibited in Zagreb, Vienna, and Budapest
 2005 Retrospektivna izložba Ivana Tišova at the Gallery of Fine Arts in Osijek
 1988 Retrospective Exhibit Ivan Tisov, Osijek

Public institutions
Tišov's work can be found in the following public buildings
 Croatian Institute of History, Zagreb
 Croatian National Theatre, Zagreb
 Croatian National Archives, Zagreb

References

1870 births
1928 deaths
Academy of Fine Arts, Munich alumni
Burials at Mirogoj Cemetery
19th-century Croatian painters
20th-century Croatian painters
Croatian male painters
People from Đakovo
19th-century Croatian male artists
20th-century Croatian male artists